Lorrie Goulet (born August 17, 1925) is an American sculptor and painter, known primarily for her direct carving of stone and wood, and for works which often celebrate women, families and cultures.

Goulet's works include philosophical and educational writings and books, and poetry. Goulet was educated at Black Mountain College from 1943 to 1944 and taught at the Art Students League of New York. She continues to create art, publish her writings, and teach in her studio in Chelsea, New York.

Life and career 
Goulet's arts studies began when at age seven she met Aimee Voorhees at the Inwood Pottery Studio in 1932 and continued working with Voorhees for four formative years. Shortly thereafter, her family moved to Los Angeles, California, where she continued her education. In 1940 she became an apprentice to Jean Rose, a ceramicist in Southern California.

In the autumn of 1943, Goulet entered Black Mountain College, North Carolina, where she studied painting and drawing with Josef Albers and weaving with Anni Albers. In the summer of 1944, she met Jose de Creeft, a visiting sculptor and instructor, and in November 1944, Goulet and de Creeft were married. Two years later, they acquired a farm in Hoosick Falls, New York, where they worked part of each year until 1968, and gave birth to artist Donna Maria de Creeft.

Goulet's first solo exhibition was in New York, in 1948. Her work has been represented in group shows since 1948, among them, a number of Annual Exhibitions at the Whitney Museum of American Art, New York, and in the fine arts pavilion of the New York World's Fair of 1964/1965. Kennedy Galleries in New York began presenting her work in 1971, with regular solo exhibitions through to 1986. In 1998, she had a solo exhibition at the National Museum of Women in the Arts in Washington D.C. entitled Fifty Years of Making Sculpture. Her work continues to be presented by David Findlay Jr. Gallery, in solo and group exhibitions, and the Harmon Meek Gallery in Naples, Florida.

Goulet's first position as a teacher of sculpture was with the Museum of Modern Art's Peoples Center, New York, in 1957, and she also began teaching privately in that year. From 1961 to 1975 she was on the faculty of The New School, New York, and began teaching at the Art Students League of New York starting in 1981 until 2004. CBS Television aired twenty-three program segments featuring Goulet's teaching, with demonstrations for children for a program called "Around the Corner" sponsored by the New York City Board of Education. These programs were aired between 1964 and 1968.

Exhibitions
Her works have been presented in museums, institutions and galleries including The Whitney Museum of American Art, Joseph H. Hirshhorn Museum & Sculpture Garden, The Smithsonian American Art Museum, National Academy of Design, National Museum of Women in the Arts, Corcoran Gallery, the Museo Nacional Centro De Arte Reina Sofia, Madrid, David Findlay Jr. Fine Art in NYC, The Kennedy Galleries in NYC, The Harmon Meek Gallery in Naples and Florida, Asheville Art Museum, and Black Mountain College Museum + Arts Center.

Selected solo exhibitions
 2014, Elizabeth V. Sullivan Gallery at Vytlacil, Art Students League of New York, Sparkill, NY
 2011, Past and Present, David Findlay Jr Fine Art, New York, NY
 2009, David Findlay Jr Fine Art, New York, NY
 2009, 2003, 2000, Harmon-Meek Gallery, Naples, FL
 2007, 2005, 2004, David Findlay Jr Fine Art, New York, NY
 2003, Process, The Art Students League, New York, NY
 2002, 2001, David Findlay Jr Fine Art, New York, NY 
 1998, Fifty Years of Making Sculpture, The National Museum of Women in the Arts, Washington, DC
 1989, 1991, Caldwell College, Caldwell, NJ
 1988, 1991, Carolyn Hill Galleries, New York, NY
 1986, 1983, 1980, 1978, The Kennedy Galleries, New York, NY
 1975, 1973, 1971, 1969, Temple Emeth, Teaneck, NJ
 1968, 1961, New School Associates, New York, NY
 1968, 1966, 1962, 1959, The Contemporaries Gallery, New York, NY
 1966, Rye Art Center, Rye, NY
 1951, The Cheney Library, Hoosick Falls, NY
 1955, 1951, 1948, Clay Club Sculpture Center, New York, NY

Public collections
 Asheville Art Museum, Asheville, NC
 The Archdiocese of New York, New York, NY
 The Art Students League, New York, NY
 The Children's Museum, Naples, FL
 Erie Art Museum, Erie, PA
 Hirshhorn Museum and Sculpture Garden, Washington, DC
 The Hunter Museum, Chattanooga, TN
 Mugar Memorial Library, Boston University, MA
 Munson-Williams-Proctor Arts Institute, Utica, NY
 National Academy of Design, New York, NY
 The National Museum of Women in the Arts, Washington, D.C.
 The National Sculpture Society, New York, NY
 The National Palace, Madrid, Spain
 New Jersey State Museum, Trenton, NJ
 New York University, Music Dep. New York, NY
 Northern Michigan University, Marquette, MI
 Palacio National, Madrid, Spain
 The Philadelphia Center for the Arts, Philadelphia, PA
 The Philharmonic Center for the Arts, Naples, FL
 Sarah Roby Foundation, New York, NY
 Smithsonian American Art Museum, Washington, DC
 Southeast Missouri State University Museum, Cape Girardeau, MO
 Tamara Kerr Art Bank, Savannah, College of Art, Savannah, GA
 Wichita Museum of Art, Wichita, KS

Commissions
 1971, Stainless Steel Relief, 49th Precinct, Police and Fire Station Headquarters, Bronx, NY
 1961, Ceramic Relief, Nurses Residence and School, Bronx Municipal Hospital, Bronx, NY
 1958. Ceramic Relief, New York Public Library, 173rd St. Branch, Grand Concourse, Bronx, NY

Selected articles and publications
 New York Magazine, 2-page centerfold and article, April 9, 2014
 La Palme Magazine, Orlando, FL, "Lorrie Goulet: The Art of Sculpture", Spring, 2014
 Black Mountain College: An Experiment in Art, Vincent Katz, pp. 80–81, 2003
 D.M. Reynolds, Masters of American Sculpture, 1994, page 224
 National Sculpture Review, Geometry and Flesh, The Sculpture and Vision of Lorrie Goulet (Cover Story), Dena Merriam, 1993
 National Sculpture Review, "Anima in Stone" (Poem), 1992
 Contemporary American Women Sculptors, Watson Jones, Oryx Press, Phoenix, AZ, 1985
 Black Mountain College Anthology, Sprouted Seeds, Mervin Lane, 1989
 The New York Review, Les Krantz, 1988
 Kennedy Galleries, Profiles of American Artists, 1981
 Dictionary of International Biography, 1974-1976
 Arts Magazine, Lorrie Goulet: Themes of Women, Karl Lunde, 1975
 Archives of American Art, Complete Life Works and Correspondence, 1975
 Women Artists in America, J.L. Collins, 1973
 Slate and Soft Stone, Frank Eliscue, 1973, 3pp, 4 plates
 National Sculpture Review, Winter, 1973
 Biographical Directory of American Artists, 1971-2001
 Sculpture in Wood, Jack C. Rich, 1970, 3 Plates
 Biographical Dictionary of American Artists, 1967
 The Palette, "20th Century Sculptors Look at Their Work", Ball State Teacher's College, 1956

Television and radio
 "Around the Corner", CBS TV, Children's sculpture series, 24 programs, 1964–68
 "The Lee Graham Show", 30-Minute interview, WNYC radio, New York, NY, Feb. 5, 1974
 "Guest Demonstrator at Work", WNET/Thirteen, Live Arts and Antiques Auction, 1978

References

External links

1925 births
20th-century American painters
Sculptors from New York (state)
Black Mountain College alumni
Living people
20th-century American women artists
21st-century American painters
American writers
20th-century American sculptors
21st-century American sculptors
21st-century American women